Mary Elizabeth Thomas Peavey Brooks (November 1, 1907 – February 11, 2002) was an American politician. She directed the United States Mint from September 1969 to February 1977.

Early life and education
Mary Elizabeth Thomas was born to John W. Thomas and Florence (Johnson) Thomas on November 1, 1907, in Colby, Kansas. Her parents moved to Gooding, Idaho, in early 1909 when she was 14 months of age. Her father was a rancher and banker; he was appointed a U.S. Senator from Idaho twice (following the deaths of Frank R. Gooding in 1928 and William Borah in 1940).

An only child, Thomas graduated from Gooding High School in 1925, and attended Mills College in Oakland, California, then a two-year women's school. She transferred to the University of Idaho in Moscow in 1927, where she was a member of the Kappa Kappa Gamma sorority, and received her bachelor's degree in economics in 1929.

Marriages
She met her first husband, Arthur Jacob "Art" Peavey, Jr. of Twin Falls, while they were students at the University of Idaho. He was a member of Phi Delta Theta fraternity and also graduated in 1929. He drowned in a boating accident on the Snake River in 1941 and wasn't found for ten days, which left her a widow in her early thirties with two young children. A short time later her mother died, so she moved her family to Washington, D.C., where her father was serving in the U.S. Senate.

Her second husband, C. Wayland "Curly" Brooks, was a U.S. Senator from Illinois. They were married in May 1946 for eleven years, until his death from a massive heart attack in 1957. After he left the Senate in January 1949, they had lived in the Chicago area.

Brooks took over her father's Idaho sheep ranch after his death in 1945 and ran it until her son took it over in 1961. He said "She was just as much at home with rancher as she was with presidents." Her Idaho license plate read "MTN MARY".

Idaho Senate
Brooks was elected to the Idaho State Senate in 1964, and served until 1969, when she was named to head the U.S. Mint by President Nixon in September. Her son, John Peavey, was appointed to her seat in the state senate and served for all but two of the next 25 years.  (He lost the Republican primary in 1976, then won the seat back as a Democrat in 1978.) A failed attempt at lieutenant governor in 1994 marked the end of his political career.

Director of the United States Mint

President Nixon appointed Brooks director of the U.S. Mint, the third woman named to the post. She oversaw the first production of the Eisenhower dollar coin, as well as the design of the Bicentennial quarter, half dollar, and dollar coins for the United States Bicentennial.

She is credited with saving the original San Francisco Mint building, known as the "Granite Lady," by transferring it to the Treasury Department. The building, one of the few to survive the Great Earthquake of 1906, had been vacant since 1937 and fallen into disrepair. It is now both a National Historic Landmark and a California Historical Landmark. Brooks received the "I Left My Heart In San Francisco" Award in 1974 from the San Francisco Convention and Visitors Bureau for her preservation efforts.

During Brooks' tenure as Director of the Mint, she famously led a tour of the U.S. Bullion Depository at Fort Knox, Kentucky for members of Congress and the news media on September 23, 1974..}}  , this tour still is the only time that the inside of the USBD has been seen by members of the public.

In addition, Brooks was awarded the American Numismatic Association's Medal of Merit in 1988, and was the first woman to receive the United States Treasury Department's highest honor, the Alexander Hamilton Award. She was inducted into the University of Idaho Alumni Association's Hall of Fame in 1970. The university also conferred upon her an honorary doctorate in 1999.

Death
Brooks died in 2002 at age 94 in Twin Falls. She was survived by a son, John Peavey (b. 1933), of Carey, and a daughter, Elizabeth Ann "Betty" Eccles (1936–2004), of McCall, and six grandchildren and eight great-grandchildren.

Video
Fort Knox tour of 1974

Notes

References

External links

 University of Idaho Library: Idaho's Women of Influence – Mary Brooks
 US Mint.gov – Directors of the United States Mint: 1792–present
People magazine article "Mary Brooks Runs a Nickel and Dime Operation: The Mint" – July 19, 1976

1907 births
2002 deaths
Directors of the United States Mint
Republican Party Idaho state senators
Mills College alumni
People from Gooding, Idaho
People from Colby, Kansas
Ranchers from Idaho
Spouses of Illinois politicians
University of Idaho alumni
Women state legislators in Idaho
Illinois Republicans
20th-century American politicians
20th-century American women politicians
Nixon administration personnel
Ford administration personnel
Carter administration personnel
Washington, D.C., Republicans